Rogosh Glacier is the 29 km long and 5 km wide glacier on Oscar II Coast, Graham Land in Antarctica situated east of Brenitsa Glacier, south of Drygalski Glacier, and southwest of Zlokuchene Glacier and Risimina Glacier.  Draining southwards from Kyustendil Ridge between Lovech Heights and Ivanili Heights, and turning eastwards north of Skilly Peak.  At the ridge forming Cape Fairweather the glacier branches to flow into Artanes Bay to the south, and into Weddell Sea west of Pedersen Nunatak to the east.

The feature is named after the settlement of Rogosh in southern Bulgaria.

Location
British mapping in 1974.

Maps
 Antarctic Digital Database (ADD). Scale 1:250000 topographic map of Antarctica. Scientific Committee on Antarctic Research (SCAR), 1993–2016.

References
 Rogosh Glacier. SCAR Composite Antarctic Gazetteer.
 Bulgarian Antarctic Gazetteer. Antarctic Place-names Commission. (details in Bulgarian, basic data in English)

External links
 Rogosh Glacier. Copernix satellite image

Glaciers of Oscar II Coast
Bulgaria and the Antarctic